WPFF FM 90.5 is an American radio station broadcasting a contemporary Christian format. Licensed to Sturgeon Bay, Wisconsin, United States, the station serves the Green Bay area. The station is owned by Educational Media Foundation and features the standard K-Love schedule.

History
WPFF was founded by Mark Schwarzbauer and operated through Family Educational Broadcasting with a broadcast largely provided by CCM. This format remained in place until just before his retirement in 2008. WPFF was sold to Bethesda Christian Broadcasting in December 2007. On October 23, 2013, it was announced that WPFF, WNLI and their associated translators would be sold to Educational Media Foundation, owners of the K-Love and Air1 Christian music networks. In mid-January 2014, the station announced that, with the sale to EMF closing, it would switch to K-Love, with sister station WNLI carrying Air1. The sale, at a price of $825,000, was completed on February 14, 2014. WNLI has since been sold to Suring, Wisconsin-based WRVM and now operates as a rebroadcaster of WRVM with calls WPVM.

On January 8, 2020, WPCK (104.9), a former commercial station licensed to Denmark that was recently acquired by EMF from Cumulus Media, began to also carry K-Love. It is unknown if there are plans to adjust WPFF's own programming, be it either station carrying Air1, and/or an adjustment of WPFF's translators to balance the carriage of both networks (as-is, a sole Sheboygan translator currently carries Air1 in Wisconsin over-the-air).

Translators
In addition to the main station, WPFF is relayed by a translator network serving northeastern Wisconsin and the Upper Peninsula of Michigan.

References
 https://radio-locator.com/info/W291CM-FX
 https://radio-locator.com/info/WPFF-FM

External links

Contemporary Christian radio stations in the United States
K-Love radio stations
Radio stations established in 1992
1992 establishments in Wisconsin
Educational Media Foundation radio stations
PFF